The 1260 is a skateboarding trick, performed on a mega ramp, in which the skateboarder makes three-and-half revolutions (1260 degrees of rotation) while airborne. It was first completed successfully on a mega ramp in August 2019 by American skateboarder Mitchie Brusco. 
This trick has not been performed on the classical vert ramp.

Successful landings

MegaRamp
 Mitchie Brusco, 3 August 2019, MegaRamp, Minneapolis, Minnesota (USA) at 2019 X Games

References

Skateboarding tricks